1st Born is a 2019 comedy film directed by Ali Atshani and starring Taylor Cole, Reza Sixo Safai, Jay Abdo, Tom Berenger, Val Kilmer and Denise Richards.  It is the first time Iran and the United States have collaborated on a film.

Plot

Cast
Taylor Cole as Kate
Reza Sixo Safai as Ben
Jay Abdo as Hamid
Tom Berenger as Tucker Jefferson
Val Kilmer as Biden
Robert Knepper as Joe
Denise Richards as Christine
Dominique Swain as Ingrid
William Baldwin as Saul

Reception
Renee Schonfeld of Common Sense Media awarded the film one star out of five.

References

External links
 
 

2019 films
American comedy films
Iranian comedy films
Comedy films about Asian Americans
Iranian-American films
2010s English-language films
2010s American films